The men's 100 metre backstroke competition of the swimming events at the 1963 Pan American Games took place on April. The last Pan American Games champion was Frank McKinney of US.

This race consisted of two lengths of the pool, all in backstroke.

Results
All times are in minutes and seconds.

Heats

Final 
The final was held on April.

References

Swimming at the 1963 Pan American Games